TOI-1333 b is an exoplanet that has an orbital period of 4.7 days. It is located 654 light years away from Earth and was discovered by TESS in January 2021.

References 

Exoplanets discovered in 2021
Exoplanets discovered by TESS